Kabiru Muhammad Inuwa (born 1965) is the 2nd emir of Rano after the death of Alhaji Tafida Abubakar Ila Auta Bawo. Before being appointed as emir of Rano, he served in the Nigerian Immigration Service (NIS) and led traditional responsibilities where he served as Kaigaman Rano and District Head of Kibiya.

Rano Emirate is one of the newly created emirates in Kano by Governor Abdullahi Umar Ganduje which was headed by Alhaji Tafida Abubakar ILa ii as 1st  emir and preceded by Kabiru Mohammad Inuwa.

Rano Emirate consists of ten Local Governments namely Rano, Kibiya, Bunkure, Kura, Tudunwada, Doguwa, Sumaila, Takai and Garunmalam and Bebeji Other emirates include; Kano Emerate, Bichi Emerate, Gaya Emerate, and Karaye Emerate.

References 

1965 births
Emirs of Rano
People from Kano
Nigerian traditional rulers
Living people